Homoranthus tropicus is a flowering plant in the family Myrtaceae and is endemic to tropical north Queensland. It is a shrub with curved, club-shaped leaves and white flowers in a corymb-like arrangement on the ends of branchlets.

Description
Flowering occurs sporadically throughout the year, primarily February to July and the fruit is a single seed retained in the calyx.

Taxonomy and naming
Homoranthus tropicus was first formally described in 1981 by Norman Byrnes from a specimen he collected north of Laura in 1975 and the description was published in Austrolbaileya.The specific epithet (tropicus) means "tropical".

Distribution and habitat
This species grows in northern Queensland in heath or shrubby woodland on shallow rocky soils over sandstone.

Conservation status
It has a restricted distribution and considered rare by Briggs and Leigh (1996) given a ROTAP conservation code of 2R.

References

External links
 The Australasian Virtual Herbarium – Occurrence data for Homoranthus tropicus

tropicus
Flora of Queensland
Plants described in 1981
Myrtales of Australia
Taxa named by Norman Brice Byrnes